Aur Zindagi Badalti Hai is a Pakistani television series directed by Mehreen Jabbar and produced by Sultana Siddiqui. It is based on a short story by Nadia Jamil and was written by Nasreen Rahman. It stars Sania Saeed, Nadia Jamil, Humayun Saeed, and Faisal Rehman. The 13-episodes series originally broadcast on Pakistan Television Corporation in 2000.

At the 1st Lux Style Awards, it received the Best TV Play nomination.

Plot 
Isra lives with her ailing father, the only member in her house. Dr. Omair, who regularly checks her father, falls for her and they both get married. Soon after their marriage, her father dies due to deteriorated health. After her father's death, she discovers that she has a sister who is currently living in Spain. She goes there in search of her where she meets her sister, Anna. While there, Isra also comes across Lali (a friend of Anna's mother), Zain (Lali's brother), and Shehryar who loves Anna. Things take a complicated turn when Isra falls for Zain.

Cast 
 Sania Saeed as Isra
 Nadia Jamil as Anna
 Humayun Saeed as Zain
 Faisal Rehman as Shehryar
 Sakina Samo as Lali
 Shabbir Jan as Bash
 Saife Hassan as Omair
 Masood Zia
 Sultana Zafar
 Mehroze Karim

Production 
Besides Pakistan, the series was shot in Spain also.

Awards and nominations

References 

Pakistan Television Corporation original programming
Pakistani television series